Exeter Book Riddle 51 (according to the numbering of the Anglo-Saxon Poetic Records) is one of the Old English riddles found in the later tenth-century Exeter Book. Its solution is 'quill pen and three fingers', 'whose figurative "journey" leaves a dark track of letters and words on the page' and it stands accordingly as an important literary example of the international riddle type, the Writing-riddle, whose most basic form is 'white field, black seeds'. In the reading of Helen Price, the riddle suggests that 'writing is a journey, but it is not one of a human being alone. The riddle is selfconsciously aware of the connected nature of human, tool, and animal'.

Text

Studies

 Lees, Clare A. 2010. ‘Basil Bunting, Briggflatts, Lindisfarne, and Anglo-Saxon Interlace’, in Anglo-Saxon Culture and the Modern Imagination, ed. by David Clark and Nicholas Perkins, Medievalism, 1 (Cambridge: Brewer), pp. 111–28.

Recordings

 Michael D. C. Drout, 'Riddle 51', performed from the Anglo-Saxon Poetic Records edition (29 October 2007).

References

Riddles
Old English literature
Old English poetry